"Birds of a Feather" is a 1968 song by Joe South from his first LP, Introspect.  It initially became a minor hit in the U.S., reaching #106 on Billboard.

South again included "Birds of a Feather" on his second album, Games People Play.  It was re-released as a single and re-charted, reaching #96 during the summer of 1969.

Coincident with the release of the Raiders' Top 40 cover, South's original was placed on his fourth album from 1971, Joe South.

The Raiders cover

The Raiders covered "Birds of a Feather" in 1971 on their album Indian Reservation.

Mark Lindsay is both the producer as well as lead singer on the song.

The Raiders' rendition reached #23 on the U.S. Billboard Hot 100 and #10 in Canada in the fall of that year.  It also peaked at #11 on the U.S. Adult Contemporary chart.  It became the group's final Top 40 hit.

Chart history
Joe South original

Raiders cover

References

External links
  (Joe South)
  (The Raiders)

1968 songs
1968 singles
1969 singles
1971 singles
Songs written by Joe South
Joe South songs
Capitol Records singles
Columbia Records singles
Paul Revere & the Raiders songs